The 2006 FC Spartak Moscow season was the club's 15th season in the Russian Premier League season. Spartak finished the season in 2nd position, qualifying for the 2006–07 UEFA Champions League Third Qualifying Round. In the 2005–06 Russian Cup, Spartak finished as Runners-up to CSKA Moscow whilst progressing to the Last 16 of the 2006–07 Russian Cup which took place during the 2007 season. In the UEFA Champions League, Spartak reached the Group Stage, facing Bayern Munich, Internazionale and Sporting CP, before finishing third and progressing to the 2006–07 UEFA Cup Round of 32 against Celta Vigo.

Season events
On 26 April, Aleksandrs Starkovs resigned as manager, with Vladimir Fedotov being appointed as his replacement the following day.

Squad

On loan

Left club during season

Transfers

In

Out

Loans out

Released

Competitions

Premier League

Results by round

Results

League table

Russian Cup

2005-06

Final

2006-07

Round of 16 took place during the 2007 season.

UEFA Champions League

Qualifying rounds

Group stage

Squad statistics

Appearances and goals

|-
|colspan="14"|Players away from the club on loan:

|-
|colspan="14"|Players who appeared for Spartak Moscow but left during the season:

|}

Goal scorers

Clean sheets

Disciplinary record

References

FC Spartak Moscow seasons
Spartak Moscow